SOTUS S: The Series is a 2017–2018 Thai television series starring Perawat Sangpotirat (Krist) and Prachaya Ruangroj (Singto). Like its prequel, it is an adaptation of the novel with same name by Bittersweet.

Directed by Jane Botta and produced by GMMTV together with Bear House Production, the series was one of the six television series for 2017 showcased by GMMTV in their "6 Natures+" event on 2 March 2017. It premiered on One31 and LINE TV on 9 December 2017, airing on Saturdays at 22:15 ICT (previously, at 22:00 ICT for the first four episodes) and 23:15 ICT (previously, at 23:00 ICT for the first four episodes), respectively. The series concluded on 10 March 2018.

The fifth episode of Our Skyy is a spin-off of the said series.

Synopsis 
Fast forward 2 years from the events in SOTUS: The Series, Kongphop (Prachaya Ruangroj) is now the head hazer in his faculty, while Arthit (Perawat Sangpotirat) works at a company called Ocean Electric. During Kongphop's final year, he needs to find an internship company and requests to work alongside Arthit over his family's company, unbeknownst to Arthit. After an outing with the company, tensions rise between the two, and both will have to decide their future.

Cast and characters

Main 
 Prachaya Ruangroj (Singto) as Kongphop Suttilak
 Perawat Sangpotirat (Krist) as Arthit Rojnapat

Supporting 
 Korn Khunatipapisiri (Oaujun) as Tew
 Pattadon Janngeon (Fiat) as Dae
 Krittanai Arsalprakit (Nammon) as Nai Weerawat
 Sivakorn Lertchuchot (Guy) as Yong
 Neen Suwanamas as May
 Thitipoom Techaapaikhun (New) as Em
 Kunchanuj Kengkarnka (Kan) as Todd
 Oranicha Krinchai (Proud) as Earth
 Napasorn Weerayuttvilai (Puimek) as Khao Fang
 Nachat Juntapun (Nicky) as John
 Korawit Boonsri (Gun) as Cherry
 Suttatip Wutchaipradit (Ampere) as Somoh
 Chanagun Arpornsutinan (Gunsmile) as Prem
 Jumpol Adulkittiporn (Off) as Bright
 Maripha Siripool (Wawa) as Maprang
 Ittikorn Kraicharoen (Ice) as Knot
 Natthawaranthorn Khamchoo as Tutah
 Ployshompoo Supasap (Jan) as Praepailin
 Naradon Namboonjit (Prince) as Oak
 Nararak Jaibumrung (Oak) as Durian

Awards and nominations

References

External links 
 SOTUS S: The Series on GMM 25 website 
 SOTUS S: The Series  on LINE TV
 GMMTV

Television series by GMMTV
Thai romantic comedy television series
Thai drama television series
Thai boys' love television series
2017 Thai television series debuts
2018 Thai television series endings
2010s college television series
One 31 original programming